Fallen Angels is the thirteenth studio album by English heavy metal band Venom. It was released by Spinefarm/Universal on 28 November 2011.

Track listing

Credits
Cronos – vocals, bass guitar
La Rage – guitar, backing vocals
Dante – drums, backing vocals

References

2011 albums
Venom (band) albums
Spinefarm Records albums